The Prairie Homestead is a sod house located at 21070 South Dakota Highway 240 north of Interior, South Dakota. The house was constructed by Ed Brown and his wife in 1909. The Browns built their home with sod bricks and topped it with a grass roof. Western South Dakota was one of the last regions of the state to be settled by homesteaders, and the house is now one of the few remaining sod homes in the state. The home is now open to visitors for tours and houses farm animals and prairie dogs on its grounds.

The house was added to the National Register of Historic Places on January 11, 1974.

References

External links

Houses on the National Register of Historic Places in South Dakota
Houses completed in 1909
Museums in Jackson County, South Dakota
Sod houses
Historic house museums in South Dakota
Houses in Jackson County, South Dakota
Historic districts on the National Register of Historic Places in South Dakota
National Register of Historic Places in Jackson County, South Dakota
1909 establishments in South Dakota